Watonwan County is a county in the U.S. state of Minnesota. As of the 2020 census, the population was 11,253. Its county seat is St. James.

History
In 1849, the recently organized Minnesota Territory legislature authorized the creation of nine large counties across the territory. In 1853, one of those original counties, Dakota, had a large area partitioned off to create Blue Earth County. In 1855 the western part of Blue Earth was partitioned to create Brown County. On February 25, 1860, the southern part of Brown was partitioned to create this county, with Madelia as the designated county seat. The county was named for its eponymous river, whose name reflects the Dakota word "watanwan," meaning "fish bait" or "plenty of fish." The word first appears in the written record on an 1843 map of the area so naming the river.

In 1869 the first settlers arrived in the area of the future Saint James, and the area began growing. In 1870 an extension of the St. Paul and Sioux City Railway was terminated at the village, and railway officials decided to name the terminus Saint James. By 1878 the town had grown to the extent that a vote was taken to move the county seat there.

Geography

The terrain of Watonwan County consists of low rolling hills, carved by drainages and dotted with lakes and ponds. The area is completely devoted to agriculture where possible. The terrain slopes to the north and east, with its highest point near its southwest corner, at 1,293' (394m) ASL. The county is drained by the Watonwan River and its tributaries; the river flows eastward through the northern part of the county.

Major highways

  Minnesota State Highway 4
  Minnesota State Highway 15
  Minnesota State Highway 30
  Minnesota State Highway 60

Airports
 St. James Municipal Airport (JYG, LID) - 3 miles (5 km) east of St. James

Adjacent counties

 Brown County - north
 Blue Earth County - east
 Martin County - south
 Jackson County - southwest
 Cottonwood County - west

Protected areas

 Bergdahl State Wildlife Management Area
 Lewisville State Wildlife Management Area
 Turtle Marsh State Wildlife Management Area
 Wilson State Wildlife Management Area
 Woodlake State Wildlife Management Area

Lakes

 Bergdahl Lake
 Bullhead Lake
 Butterfield Lake
 Case Lake
 Cottonwood Lake
 Ewy Lake
 Fedji Lake
 Irish Lake
 Long Lake
 Mary Lake
 Mud Lake
 Kansas Lake
 Saint James Lake
 School Lake
 Sulem Lake
 Wilson Lake ("School Lake" in some records)
 Wood Lake (part)

Demographics

2000 census
As of the 2000 census, there were 11,876 people, 4,627 households, and 3,141 families in the county. The population density was 27.3/sqmi (10.5/km2). There were 5,036 housing units at an average density of 11.6/sqmi (4.47/km2). The racial makeup of the county was 88.54% White, 0.37% Black or African American, 0.21% Native American, 0.87% Asian, 0.02% Pacific Islander, 8.78% from other races, and 1.21% from two or more races. 15.19% of the population were Hispanic or Latino of any race. 40.9% were of German, 17.3% Norwegian and 5.8% Swedish ancestry.

There were 4,627 households, out of which 32.50% had children under the age of 18 living with them, 56.60% were married couples living together, 7.30% had a female householder with no husband present, and 32.10% were non-families. 28.70% of all households were made up of individuals, and 15.40% had someone living alone who was 65 years of age or older. The average household size was 2.53 and the average family size was 3.10.

The county population contained 27.60% under the age of 18, 7.80% from 18 to 24, 24.30% from 25 to 44, 21.70% from 45 to 64, and 18.60% who were 65 years of age or older. The median age was 39 years. For every 100 females there were 95.40 males. For every 100 females age 18 and over, there were 94.50 males.

The median income for a household in the county was $35,441, and the median income for a family was $42,321. Males had a median income of $29,242 versus $19,788 for females. The per capita income for the county was $16,413. About 7.80% of families and 9.80% of the population were below the poverty line, including 13.50% of those under age 18 and 8.80% of those age 65 or over.

2020 Census

Communities

Cities

 Butterfield
 Darfur
 La Salle
 Lewisville
 Madelia
 Odin
 Ormsby (partly in Martin County)
 St. James (county seat)

Unincorporated communities

 Echols
 Godahl (partial)
 Grogan
 South Branch
 Sveadahl
 Tenmile Corner

Townships

 Adrian Township
 Antrim Township
 Butterfield Township
 Fieldon Township
 Long Lake Township
 Madelia Township
 Nelson Township
 Odin Township
 Riverdale Township
 Rosendale Township
 St. James Township
 South Branch Township

Government and politics
Watonwan County voters tend to vote Republican. In two-thirds of presidential elections since 1980, the county has selected the Republican nominee (as of 2020).

See also
 National Register of Historic Places listings in Watonwan County, Minnesota

Footnotes

Further reading
 John A. Brown (ed.), History of Cottonwood and Watonwan counties, Minnesota: Their People, Industries, and Institutions: With Biographical Sketches of Representative Citizens and Genealogical Records of Many of the Old Families. In Two Volumes. Indianapolis, IN: B.F. Bowen and Company, 1916. Volume 1 | Volume 2

 
Minnesota counties
Minnesota placenames of Native American origin
1860 establishments in Minnesota
Populated places established in 1860